Moana: Original Motion Picture Soundtrack is the soundtrack to the 2016 Disney animated film Moana. The soundtrack was released by Walt Disney Records on November 19, 2016. It features songs written by Lin-Manuel Miranda, Mark Mancina and Opetaia Foa'i, with lyrics in English, Samoan, Tokelauan and Tuvaluan. The two-disc deluxe edition includes the score, which was composed by Mancina, as well as demos, outtakes and instrumental karaoke tracks. The record also produced two singles.

The album debuted on the Billboard 200 chart at number 16 and peaked at number 2, kept off the top spot by The Weeknd's Starboy. "How Far I'll Go" was nominated for the Golden Globe Award for Best Original Song and the Academy Award for Best Original Song.

Recording
For the soundtrack, Disney wanted to combine traditional South Pacific culture with pop and Broadway sensibilities, which led to the hiring of Broadway playwright, songwriter and composer Lin-Manuel Miranda, composer Mark Mancina and Tokelauan singer-songwriter Opetaia Foa'i. The first song they completed was "We Know the Way", which Foa'i began after his first meeting with Disney in December 2013. The trio worked together in New Zealand and in Los Angeles. At the same time, Miranda was also developing and starring in the Broadway musical Hamilton, which meant he was able to recruit Hamilton stars Phillipa Soo, Christopher Jackson, and Renée Elise Goldsberry as well as In The Heights star Marcy Harriell to help him record demos of his songs.

The songs feature Foa'i's New Zealand-based vocal group Te Vaka, as well as a choir from Fiji. The soundtrack contains seven original songs, two reprises, and two end-credits versions of songs from the film. Mancina composed the score and produced both the score and the songs. In addition to guitars and strings, the score features Polynesian vocals and percussion, woodwinds made from bamboo from the South Pacific, and traditional hide-covered Tyka drums.

According to Miranda, "Shiny" was inspired by the Flight of the Conchords' tribute to David Bowie at the Aspen Comedy Festival in 2004, as well as listening to Bowie's songs on a loop shortly after the singer's death in January 2016.

Commercial performance
"How Far I'll Go" appears during the film performed by actress Auliʻi Cravalho, and during the end credits performed by Canadian singer-songwriter Alessia Cara. A music video for Cara's version of the song was released on November 3, 2016. It reached number 88 on the Billboard Hot 100 for the week of December 17, 2016. South African singer Lira and Filipino singer Janella Salvador recorded two English-language versions of "How Far I'll Go" that played over the end credits on the South African and Filipino release of the film, while Indonesian singer Maudy Ayunda and Malaysian singer Ayda Jebat recorded their own versions of the song respectively in Indonesian and Malaysian language.

Lin-Manuel Miranda and Jordan Fisher sing a duet on "You're Welcome", which plays over the end credits. The song as performed by Dwayne Johnson appears in the film. Johnson's version of "You're Welcome" peaked at number 83 on the Billboard Hot 100 for the week of December 17, 2016. The soundtrack also features Jemaine Clement, who voices the coconut crab Tamatoa.

The album sold 509,000 copies in the United States by April 2017, making it the third soundtrack to surpass a half-million in sales that year after Suicide Squad and Trolls. Moana sold 709,000 copies and earned 1,254,000 album-equivalents, finishing as the country's fifth best-selling album of the year and had its ninth largest overall album consumption.

Critical reception

Pable Ruiz of Rotascopers said "After the enormous success of Frozen, with its Broadway-type songs written by the married duo of Robert and Kristen Anderson-Lopez, Disney decided to repeat the formula" [and use a Broadway star for the recording]. The Deluxe version includes demo songs and songs which were cut from the movie's theatric version.

Accolades
At the 74th Golden Globe Awards, "How Far I'll Go" was nominated for Best Original Song. It also received a nomination for Best Original Song at the 89th Academy Awards.

Track listing

Charts

Weekly charts

Year-end charts

Decade-end charts

Tracks

Certifications

Notes

References

2016 soundtrack albums
Disney animation soundtracks
Pop soundtracks
Walt Disney Records soundtracks
World music albums
Tokelauan music
Albums produced by Lin-Manuel Miranda
Adventure film soundtracks
Musical film soundtracks
Moana (2016 film)